Islamiyah Matriculation Higher Secondary School (IMHSS) is a high school in Coimbatore, Tamil Nadu, India. The most important thing in Islamiyah Matriculation Higher Secondary School is "Education with Ethics". Hence, moral education is given to the students. Everyday Moral classes are being taught for one hour and practiced whole day.

History
The school started with 72 students and 2 teachers in the year 1980. Slowly it was upgraded as Islamiyah Matriculation School in 1988 and Islamiyah Matriculation Higher Secondary School in 1999.

The Founder
Marhoom. N. K. Muhammad sb, basically a fish salesman, had a thirst for imparting education for the economically and educationally backward people; that is the reason he laid the stone for Islamic Nursery and Primary School with his team in the year 1982.

Islamic schools in India
Primary schools in Tamil Nadu
High schools and secondary schools in Tamil Nadu
Education in Coimbatore district